Pamrevlumab (INN; development code FG-3019) is a humanized monoclonal antibody designed for the treatment of idiopathic pulmonary fibrosis and pancreatic cancer. It binds to the connective tissue growth factor (CTGF) protein.

This drug was developed by FibroGen, Inc.

References 

Monoclonal antibodies